Hila may refer to:

plural form of Hilum
Village in Israel: Mitzpe Hila
Hila (given name), in Hebrew
 For the Islamic concept of "stratagem", see Ḥiyal
Hila, Ambon, the town on the Indonesian island of Ambon where Fort Amsterdam was sited. 
 Village Development Committee in Nepal
Siren (DC Comics), a DC Comics character who has the name Hila.